Michal Aviad (born 1955,
Jerusalem) is an Israeli director, script writer, producer and senior lecturer at the Department of Cinema and Television, Tel Aviv University.

Biography
Michal Aviad was born in Jerusalem in 1955. Her mother was an immigrant from Italy and her father an immigrant from Hungary. She graduated in literature and philosophy from Tel Aviv University. In 1984, she received a Master of Film from San Francisco State University. Between 1981 and 1990 she lived and worked in San Francisco where she made her first film. She is a senior lecturer at the department of Cinema and Television at Tel Aviv University.
Aviad's films bring to light the complex relationships between women issues and other major social-political issues such as the Palestinian-Israeli conflict.

In November 2019, Aviad was rewarded one of Israel's most prestigious awards, the Landau Award for Arts and Sciences, endowed by Mifal HaPais Council for the Culture and Arts, which cited her as "one of the most important directors in the history of Israeli cinema".

Filmography
Acting Our Age (1987, 60 min, production and direction)

Acting Our Age is Aviad's first movie, which she produced and directed in the United States. The film deals with the experience of aging among women, and tackles age-linked stereotypes and discrimination. The film received several prizes and was the first to be broadcast within the prestigious documentary slot POV (Point of View) on the American public network PBS. It was broadcast in several international festivals including the Sundance Film Festival and the Telluride film festival in the USA.

The Women Next Door (1992, 80 min, production and direction

The film deals with the involvement of women, both as conquerors and as conquered, in the Israeli-Palestinian conflict. It takes place during the First Intifada. The film was screened in many festivals including Jerusalem, Munich, São Paulo, Chicago, Calcutta, and INPUT 93, and got the Prize of Peace in the International Film Festival in Berlin. It was broadcast on many television stations in the world, including coast-to-coast broadcasting in the US, but never in Israel.

Ever Shot Anyone? (1995, 60 min, direction)

Produced by Amit Goren,  this documentary explores Israeli male culture from a woman's point of view. The video was part of the Hong Kong International Film Festival, Feminale, the Leipzig Film Festival, INPUT ’96, London Jewish Film Festival, Washington Jewish Film Festival, Flaherty film Seminar and many others. It was aired in Canada, Israel, Holland, Denmark, Russia and other countries.

Jenny and Jenny (1997, 60 mn)

A film on two teenage working-class Israeli girls, Jenny and Jenny was awarded Best Israeli Documentary for 1997 from the Israel Film Institute. It was part of the Jerusalem International Film Festival, Denver Film Festival, Boston Film Festival, Feminale, San Francisco Jewish Film Festival, Films des Femmes in France and INPUT ’98. To date it was aired in Germany, Sweden and Israel.

Ramleh (2001, 60 min, direction and coproduction)

Produced with the help of the Soros Documentary Fund, Ramleh is a social-political film about the lives of four women in the town of Ramleh, a Jewish- Arab town, and a powerful example to the disintegration of a country of displaced people torn by religious, national and cultural differences. The film was part of the Jerusalem International Film Festival, FIPA 2002, Munich, Prague, Istanbul, Milano, Mumbai, Kalamata, Human Rights Watch Film Festival in New York and others.

For My Children (2002, 66 min, production and direction)

This is personal film about the history and events in the life of one family of immigrants and refugees as seen through the prism of the first days of the new Intifada. The film is co-produced with Israel and ZDF-ARTE. So far the film took part in the Leipzig film Festival, MoMa Documentary Series, Boston & Washington Jewish Film Festivals, San Francisco International Film Festival, Munich Documentary, Visions du réel documentary film festival in Nyon, Switzerland, INPUT 03, Istanbul Documentary, Berlin Cinematheque, Palestinian- Israeli Film Festival in Paris and Brussels and others.

Invisible (2011, 90 min, direction) AKA Lo Roim Alaich

Ronit Elkabetz and Evgenia Dodina star in this story where two women are brought together over a shared trauma; they were both victims of a serial rapist twenty years earlier. Their characters are fictional but the rapist is real, having raped 16 women and girls in Tel Aviv between 1977 and 1978. Therefore, actual victim testimonies are interlaced into the film.

Invisible was part of more than 30 festivals across the globe, was theatrically exhibited in New York, Israel and France and has received the Ecumenical Prize at the 2011 Belin International Festival (Panorama section), Best Israeli Film and Best Actress at the 2011 Haifa Film festival and the Grand Prize at the 2012 Women International Film Festival in France.

The Women Pioneers (2013, 51-min, produced by Eden Productions) AKA Ha'Chalutzot

this documentary made of archives, uncovers the passion, struggle and pain of women pioneers  who came to Palestine a hundred years ago to create a new world and a new woman. Research Prize, DocAviv Film Festival, 2013, Best Documentary, Women Film Festival, Israel, 2013, and Best Experimental Film, Polish Jewish Film Festival, Warsaw, 2014.

Dimona Twist (2016, 71-min, produced by Lama Films)

This documentary tells the stories of Seven women arrive in Israel by ship in the 1950s and 1960s and are sent straight to Dimona, a town recently established in the desert. Best Documentary at The Jerusalem Film Festival.

Working Woman  (2018, 93-min, produced by Lama Films)

Working Woman is her second fiction feature film. The film is about an ambitious young mother, who aspires to succeed at her new job without paying the price that her boss demands.

Awards

See also
Israeli cinema

References

Further reading

Ever Shot Anyone
 Berman Emanuel, Rosenheimer Timna and Aviad Michal (2003). Documentary Directors and their Protagonists: A Transferential / Counter-Transferential Relationships? In Sabbadini Andrea (ed.) The Couch and the Silver Screen: Psychoanalytic Reflections on European Cinema (pp. 213–231) London: Brunner-Routledge.
 Zanger Anat (2005) Sweet Einat Strikes Back : Positions Feminines de la Camera en Temps de Guerre. In Euvrard Janine (ed.) Israeliens, Palestiniens que Peut le Cinema ? Paris: Editions Michalon. (pp 121–127).
 Zanger Anat (2005) Women, Border, and Camera. Israeli feminine framing of war .Feminist Media Studies, Vol. 5, Issue 3, (pp 341–357)

On For My Children
 Polland Lisa (2004) For My Children by Michal Aviad Hawwa-Journal of Women of the Middle East & the Islamic World, Academic Publishers Brill. Vol 2, 272–278.
 Oachs Juliana (2004) Michal Aviad: For My Children Nashim: A Journal of Jewish Women's Studies & Gender Issues, Indiana University Press. Number 7, 266-270
 Seja Nina (forthcoming) Exile, Liminality and Split Consciousness in Michal Aviad's For My Children and Mona Hatoum's Measures of Distance (15 p)
 Munk Yael (2005) La Maternite Comme Attitude Oppositionelle : sur Pour Mes Enfants (2002) de Michal Aviad. In Euvrard Janine (ed.) Israeliens, Palestiniens que Peut le Cinema? Paris: Editions Michalon. (pp: 235–239)
 Munk Yael (2006) Motherhood as an Oppositional Standpoint: Michal Aviad's “For My Children” Gender in Conflicts : Palestine-Israel- Germany. Christina von Braun & Ulrike Auga. Berlin (ed) :LIT Verlag, (pp. 143–148.)
 Talmon Miri (forthcoming) Cameras in Contested Territories: War and Peace as Gendered Alternatives in Israeli Documentary Films.
Yael Munk (2007) Motherhood as an Oppositional Standpoint: On Michal Aviad's For My Children, in Gender in Conflicts: Palestine-Israel-Germany, ed. Christina von Braun & Ulrike Auga Berlin: LIT Verlag, pp. 143–148.
Burstein Janet (2009) Moving Through Several DarknessesMinerva: Journal of Women and War,McFarland Publishers (pp. 89–102) 
Linda Dittmar (2012) The Eye of the Storm: The Political Stake of Israeli I Movies in The Cinema of Me: The Self and Subjectivity in First Person Documentary, Ed: Alisa Lebow, New York, Columbia University Press, pages 158–172. 
Efrén Cuevas (2013) Home movies as personal archives in autobiographical documentaries. Studies in Documentary Films, VOL 7,  No. 1, pp17–29
שמוליק דובדבני (2010), גוף ראשון, מצלמה, הוצאת כתר   ע"מ 160–162, 170-175

Ever Shot Anyone?

 שמוליק דובדבני (2010), גוף ראשון, מצלמה, הוצאת כתר   ע"מ 160–162, 170-175   
 Burstein Janet (2013) Like Windows in the Wall: Four Documentaries by Israeli Women.  Nashim: A Journal of Jewish Women's Studies&Gender Issues, Indiana University Press, Number 25, Fall 5774/2013 pp. 129–146.

The Women Next Door

 שמוליק דובדבני (2010), גוף ראשון, מצלמה, הוצאת כתר   ע"מ 160–162, 170-175    
 Yael Munk (2011)  Ethics and Responsibility : The Feminization of the New Israeli Documentary. Israel Studies, Vol. 16, number 2, summer 2011, pp. 151–164.
 Burstein Janet (2013) Like Windows in the Wall: Four Documentaries by Israeli Women.  Nashim: A Journal of Jewish Women's Studies&Gender Issues, Indiana University Press, Number 25, Fall 5774/2013 pp. 129–146.
 Eitan Orkibi(2015) Judea and Samaria in Israel documentary cinema: displacement, oriental space and the cultural construction of colonized landscapes. Israel Affairs VOL 21, No 3,   Page 408–421, Taylor & Francis

Invisible

 AC Loranger (2011)Invisible: Venir à bout du viol, Séquences: La revue de cinema No. 274, pp 33-35
 Régine-Mihal Friedman (2012) Invisible metamorphoses, Studies in Documentary Film, VOL6,  No 3,  pp 273–290, Taylor & Francis.
 Ariel Schweitzer (2013) Le nouveau cinéma israélien, Paris, éditions Yellow Now, 2013
 Neta Alexander (2016), A Body in Every Cellar: The "New Violence" Movement in Israeli Cinema, Jewish Film & New Media,  Vol. 4: Iss. 1, Article 2    
 Raz, “Conditions of Visibility: Trauma and Contemporary Israeli Women’s Cinema,” Signs: Journal of Women in Culture and Society, (2016).

Jenny & Jenny

 Yaron Shemer (2013) Identity, Place, and Subversion in Contemporary Mizrahi Cinema in Israel,  University of Michigan Press pp 223–249.

Ramleh

 Yaron Shemer (2013) Identity, Place, and Subversion in Contemporary Mizrahi Cinema in Israel,  University of Michigan Press pp 223–249.

External links
 "The Women Pioneers" - The full film is available on VOD on the website for the Israel Film Archive - Jerusalem Cinematheque
 
 Michal Aviad in the Women Make Movies catalog

Israeli film producers
Israeli film directors
Academic staff of Tel Aviv University
Educators from Jerusalem
1955 births
Living people
Israeli people of Italian-Jewish descent
Israeli people of Hungarian-Jewish descent